Franz Schwarzer House is a historic home located at Washington, Franklin County, Missouri. It was built in two sections.  The first section was built before 1868, and is a two-story, gable-roofed clapboarded structure with a one-story, lean-to addition.  A two-story, hip-roofed brick dwelling of ell-shaped plan, was added in 1872.  It features an ornate widow's walk and gingerbread porch/balcony in the Victorian style.

It was listed on the National Register of Historic Places in 1978.

References

Houses on the National Register of Historic Places in Missouri
Victorian architecture in Missouri
Houses completed in 1872
Buildings and structures in Franklin County, Missouri
National Register of Historic Places in Franklin County, Missouri